This article lists the albums attributed to the anime and visual novel adaptations of Strawberry Panic!.

Anime OP/ED

Shōjo Meiro de Tsukamaete

 is a single by Aki Misato released on April 26, 2006, in Japan by Lantis. The song "Shōjo Meiro de Tsukamaete" was the first opening theme to the anime Strawberry Panic!.

Track listing
 – 4:08
"before" – 4:27
 – 4:08
"before" (off vocal) – 4:27

Himitsu Dolls

 is a single by Mai Nakahara and Ai Shimizu released on May 24, 2006, in Japan by Lantis. The song "Himitsu Dolls" was the first ending theme to the anime Strawberry Panic!.

Track listing
 – 3:55
 – 4:48
 – 3:55
 – 4:48

Kuchibiru Daydream

 is a single by Aki Misato released on August 9, 2006, in Japan by Lantis. The song "Kuchibiru Daydream" was the second opening theme to the anime Strawberry Panic!.

Track listing
 – 4:05
"true love?" – 3:54
 – 4:05
"true love?" (off vocal) – 3:54

Ichigo Tsumi Monogatari

 is a single by Mai Nakahara and Ai Shimizu released on August 23, 2006, in Japan by Lantis. The song "Ichigo Tsumi Monogatari" was the second ending theme to the anime Strawberry Panic!.

Track listing
 – 4:21
"Venus Panic" – 4:12
 – 4:21
"Venus Panic" (off vocal) – 4:12

Soundtracks

Anime

The Strawberry Panic! original soundtrack is the soundtrack to the anime version of Strawberry Panic! first released by Lantis on September 6, 2006.

Track listing

Little Bird

PlayStation 2 game

PlayStation 2 Game Strawberry Panic! Original Sound Track is the original soundtrack to the PlayStation 2 video game from the Strawberry Panic! series.

Track listing

"Sweetest" (Off Vocal Ver)

"Sweetest"
Vocals: CooRie

Vocals: Mai Nakahara

Drama CDs

Lyric 1

"Strawberry Panic" Lyric 1 "Miator volume" is the first drama CD based on the anime version of the series Strawberry Panic! and was first released on July 26, 2006.

Track listing

Lyric 2

"Strawberry Panic" Lyric 2 "Spica volume" is the second drama CD based on the anime version of the series Strawberry Panic! and was first released on October 25, 2006.

Track listing

Lyric 3

"Strawberry Panic" Lyric 3 "Lulim volume" is the third drama CD based on the anime version of the series Strawberry Panic! and was first released on December 6, 2006.

Track listing

Voice actors
Thirteen of the voice actors from the anime also provided their voices for their respective characters in the drama CD.
Nagisa Aoi - Mai Nakahara
Tamao Suzumi - Ai Shimizu
Shizuma Hanazono - Hitomi Nabatame
Miyuki Rokujō - Junko Noda
Chiyo Tsukidate - Chiwa Saitō
Hikari Konohana - Miyu Matsuki
Amane Ōtori - Yuko Kaida
Yaya Nanto - Natsuko Kuwatani
Tsubomi Okuwaka - Sakura Nogawa
Chikaru Minamoto - Saki Nakajima
Kizuna Hyūga - Ai Shimizu
Remon Natsume - Ui Miyazaki
Kagome Byakudan - Yukari Fukui

Web radio CDs

Volume 1

The first web radio album entitled  was released on March 8, 2006, by Lantis.

Track listing

Volume 2

The second web radio album entitled  was released on July 5, 2006, by Lantis.

Track listing
序章 ~それはきっと白百合の誘惑にございましょう~
第1章 ~夏子の奥~
姉川柳 ~清き花粉はお姉さま~
姉メロミックス ~桑谷夏子お姉様とともに~
第2章 ~千和の奥~
姉川柳 ~過ぎ行く如月、姉ごよみ~
姉メロミックス ~斎藤千和お姉様とともに~
第3章 ~未祐の奥~
姉川柳 ~熟れて膨れてお姉さま~
姉メロミックス ~松来未祐お姉様とともに~
第4章 ~さくらの奥~
姉川柳 ~心擽るお姉さま~
姉メロミックス ~野川さくらお姉様とともに~
終章 ~つわものどもが夢のあとでございます~
姉川柳 ~蕾に触れてお姉さま~
姉川柳 ~微香に酔ってお姉さま~
姉川柳 ~バスルームは姉の香り~
姉川柳 ~お姉さまのグリンピース~
姉川柳 ~雨音はお姉さまの調べ~
入学試験の諸注意、及び、入学式の諸注意

Volume 3

The third web radio album entitled  was released on January 11, 2007, by Lantis.

Track listing
開会の辞
卒業証書授与 という名の姉川柳
卒業生の言葉 ~松来未祐
卒業生の言葉 ~木下紗華
卒業生の言葉 ~後藤沙緒里
卒業生の言葉 ~中島沙樹
卒業生の言葉 ~生天目仁美
在校生送辞 という名の姉川柳
卒業生答辞(フリートーク)
卒業生退場曲(姉メロ)「ドレープ」
卒業生退場曲(姉メロ)「言うに事欠いて」
卒業生退場曲(姉メロ)「あふれ」
卒業生退場曲(姉メロ)「焦燥」
卒業生退場曲(姉メロ)「そばにいて」
卒業生退場曲(姉メロ)「秘密の染み」
卒業生退場曲(姉メロ)「姉と姉」
卒業生退場曲(姉メロ)「振り向き様」
卒業生退場曲(姉メロ)「覚悟」
卒業生退場曲(姉メロ)「愛の耳鳴り」
特選姉川柳「濡れて触れたら、お姉様」
特選姉川柳「火照る日焼けと、お姉様」
特選姉川柳「拭き取る雫と、お姉様」
特選姉川柳「浴衣で愛でて、お姉様」
特選姉川柳「祭囃子と、お姉様」
特選姉川柳「子猫の声で、お姉様」
特選姉川柳「満月の夜は、お姉様」
特選姉川柳「暖められて、お姉様」
特選姉川柳「至近距離です、お姉様」
特選姉川柳「炬燵の中で、お姉様」
合同文化祭諸注意
少女迷路でつかまえて (Mellow Berry Ballad)

References

Anime soundtracks
Drama audio recordings
Film and television discographies
Discographies of Japanese artists
Lantis (company) albums
Lantis (company) soundtracks
Albums